Trona is a genus of sea snails, marine gastropod mollusks in the subfamily Luriinae of the family Cypraeidae, the cowries.

Species
Species within the genus Trona include:
 † Trona leporina (Lamarck, 1810) 
 † Trona rostrata (Grateloup, 1845) 
 Trona stercoraria (Linnaeus, 1758)

Distribution
This genus is found in the Atlantic Ocean off of Cape Verde, Senegal and Angola.

References

 Burgess C.M. (1985). Cowries of the world. Cape Town: Gordon Verhoef, Seacomber Publications. xiv + 289 pp.
 Rolán E., 2005. Malacological Fauna From The Cape Verde Archipelago. Part 1, Polyplacophora and Gastropoda.
 Lorenz F. & Hubert A. (2000) A guide to worldwide cowries. Edition 2. Hackenheim: Conchbooks. 584 pp.

External links
 Jousseaume, F. (1884). Division des Cypraeidae. Le Naturaliste. 6(52): 414-415
 Blainville, H. M. D. de. (1824). Mollusques, Mollusca (Malacoz.), pp. 1-392. In: Dictionnaire des Sciences Naturelles (F. Cuvier, ed.), vol. 32. Levrault, Strasbourg et Paris, & Le Normant, Paris

Cypraeidae
Gastropod genera